Daniel Mary Gorman (April 12, 1861 – June 9, 1927) was an American prelate of the Roman Catholic Church. He served as bishop of the Diocese of Boise in Idaho from 1918 until his death in 1927.

Biography

Early life 
Daniel Gorman was born in Wyoming, Iowa, to John and Mary (née Rooney) Gorman. His father was born in County Sligo, Ireland, and his mother in Montreal, Quebec, Canada. After graduating from Wyoming High School, he entered St. Joseph's College  in Dubuque. He continued his studies at St. Francis Seminary in Milwaukee, Wisconsin.

Priesthood 
Gorman was ordained to the priesthood on June 24, 1893. He served as pastor of a small parish in State Center, Iowa, for one year before joining the faculty of St. Joseph's College. From 1904 to 1918, he was president of St. Joseph's. During his tenure, the college saw its greatest expansion of grounds and building, the high school department was extended, and the four-year course was initiated in 1915. Gorman was elevated to protonotary apostolic on April 19, 1917.

Bishop of Boise 
On February 6, 1918, Gorman was appointed the second bishop of the Diocese of Boise by Pope Benedict XV. He received his episcopal consecration on May 1, 1918, from Archbishop Giovanni Bonzano, with Bishops Mathias Lenihan and Joseph Glass, C.M., serving as co-consecrators. During his nine years as bishop, he added 32 diocesan priests, completed St. John's Cathedral to its present size in 1921, and doubled the enrollment in parish schools.

Daniel Gorman died in Lewiston, Idaho on June 9, 1927 at age 66.

References

1861 births
1927 deaths
People from Jones County, Iowa
People from Boise, Idaho
Loras College alumni
St. Francis Seminary (Wisconsin) alumni
Roman Catholic bishops of Boise
20th-century Roman Catholic bishops in the United States
Roman Catholic Archdiocese of Dubuque
Religious leaders from Iowa
Catholics from Iowa
Loras College faculty